The following highways are numbered 363:

Canada
Manitoba Provincial Road 363
 New Brunswick Route 363
Newfoundland and Labrador Route 363
 Quebec Route 363
Saskatchewan Highway 363

Japan
 Japan National Route 363

United States
  Arkansas Highway 363
  Florida State Road 363
  Georgia State Route 363 (former)
  Georgia State Route 363 Spur (former)
  Maryland Route 363
  New York State Route 363 (disambiguation)
  Ohio State Route 363
  Pennsylvania Route 363
  Puerto Rico Highway 363
  South Carolina Highway 363
 Texas:
  Texas State Highway 363
  Farm to Market Road 363
  Virginia State Route 363